Lipase maturation factor 1 is an enzyme that in humans is encoded by the LMF1 gene.

References

Further reading